Kanaanäische und Aramäische Inschriften (in English, Canaanite and Aramaic Inscriptions), or KAI, is the standard source for the original text of Canaanite and Aramaic inscriptions not contained in the Hebrew Bible and Old Testament.

It was first published from 1960 to 1964 in three volumes by the German Orientalists Herbert Donner and Wolfgang Röllig, and has been updated in numerous subsequent editions.

The work attempted to "integrate philology, palaeography and cultural history" in the commented re-editing of a selection of Canaanite and Aramaic Inscriptions, using the "pertinent source material for the Phoenician, Punic, Moabite, pre-exile-Hebrew and Ancient Aramaic cultures." Röllig and Donner had the support of William F. Albright in Baltimore, James Germain Février in Paris and Giorgio Levi Della Vida in Rome during the compilation of the first edition.

Editions

The 4th edition was published between 1966-69, and a 5th edition was published in 2002. However, the 5th edition only comprised the first volume (showing the texts in modern Hebrew script), expanding the previous edition by 40 texts. An updated version of the third volume (a brief bibliography of all the texts in Volume 1) was proposed.

The first edition was intended to represent all the known texts of significant importance, but not to be a complete collection to replace the Corpus Inscriptionum Semiticarum. With respect to Aramaic inscriptions, all stone inscriptions until the Achaemenid Empire were included, whereas Imperial Aramaic inscriptions are only partially represented. Less emphasis was put on Aramaic papyri, ostraca and clay tablets, as such collections either already existed or were being prepared elsewhere. The included papyri and ostraca were chosen in order to provide and objective rounding of the picture, such as if they were published in a remote location. Nabataean and Palmyrene inscriptions were excluded, as were most of the Elephantine papyri.

The inscriptions were ordered geographically, and then chronologically within each geography; a division was made between “Punic” and “Neo Punic” that was acknowledged to be subjective.

In the second edition, four new texts were added - the fourth of the Karatepe inscriptions (KAI 26), and the three new texts (KAI 277-279). In the fifth edition, 40 new texts were added, primarily because they were only discovered or published after the appearance of the original edition or - like the Agrigentum inscription (KAI 302) - were given a new relevance due to a recent interpretation.

Two groups of new texts were not included in the fifth edition: new Hebrew inscriptions, which were considered to have been well summarized in J. Renz / W. Röllig, Handbuch der Althebraische Epigraphik (Darmstadt 1995-2002) and the Imperial Aramaic texts from Egypt, which were considered to have been well summarized in B. Porten / A Yardeni, Textbook of Aramaic documents from ancient Egypt Vol. 1-4 (1986-1999).

Phoenician inscriptions

A.I: From "the Motherland" (KAI 1-22, 280-286)
Byblos
 KAI 1: Ahiram Sarcophagus
 KAI 4: Yehimilk inscription
 KAI 5: Abiba’l inscription (RES 505)
 KAI 6: Osorkon Bust
 KAI 7: Safatba'al inscription
 KAI 9: Son of Shipitbaal inscription
 KAI 10: Yehawmilk Stele (CIS I 1)
 KAI 11: Batnoam inscription
 KAI 12: Byblos altar inscription

Sidon
 KAI 13: Tabnit sarcophagus (RES 1202)
 KAI 14: Eshmunazar II sarcophagus (CIS I 3)
 KAI 15-16: Bodashtart inscriptions (RES 766-767)

Tyre
 KAI 17: Throne of Astarte

Umm al-Amad
 KAI 18: Baalshamin inscription  (CIS I 7)

Masub
 KAI 19: Masub inscription (RES 1205)

Tel Miqne
 KAI 286: Ekron Royal Dedicatory Inscription

A.II: From Syria and Asia Minor (KAI 23-29, 287)
Sam'al
 KAI 24: Kilamuwa Stela

Karatepe
 KAI 26: Karatepe bilingual

Çebel Ires Daǧı
 KAI 287:  Çebel Ires Daǧı inscription

A.III: From the islands (KAI 30-47, 288-292)
Cyprus

 KAI 30: Archaic Cyprus inscription (origin unknown)
 KAI 31: Baal Lebanon inscription (Limassol)  (CIS I 5)
 KAI 33 and 35: Pococke Kition inscriptions (CIS I 11 and CIS I 46)
 KAI 32, 34, 36, 37, 288-290: Later Kition inscriptions
 KAI 38-40: Idalium (KAI 39 = Idalion bilingual) (CIS I 89, 90, 93)
 KAI 41: Tamassos trilingual
 KAI 42-43: Lapathus  (CIS I 95)

Rhodes
 KAI 44-45: Rhodes inscriptions

Sardinia
 KAI 46: Nora Stone

Malta
 KAI 47: Cippi of Melqart

Crete
 KAI 291: Tekke Bowl Inscription (Knossos)

Kos
 KAI 292: Hellenistic Greek-Phoenician bilingual

A.IV: From Egypt (KAI 48-52)
 KAI 48: Memphis inscription (RES 1)
 KAI 49: Abydos inscription (CIS I 99-110)
 KAI 50: Saqqara inscription
 KAI 51-52 (origin unknown)

A.V: From Greece (KAI 53-60, 293)
 KAI 53-55: Athens inscriptions (CIS I 115-117)
 KAI 56-60: Piraeus inscriptions (CIS I 118-120)
 KAI 293: Demetrias inscription

A.Addition: From mainland Europe (KAI 277, 294)
 KAI 277: Pyrgi Tablets
 KAI 294: Seville statue of Astarte

Punic inscriptions

B.I: From the islands (KAI 61-68, 295-301)

B.II. From mainland Europe (KAI 69-72)

B.III. From Africa (KAI 73-116, 302-305)
Carthage
 KAI 74

Neopunic inscriptions

C.I: From Africa (KAI 117-171)
 KAI 137: Baal Hammon inscription (Sanctuaire de Thinissut)

C.II: From Sardinia (KAI 172-173)

D. Moabite and Ammonite inscriptions (KAI 181, 306, 307-308)
 KAI 181: Mesha Stele
 KAI 306: El-Kerak Inscription
 KAI 307: Amman Citadel Inscription
 KAI 308: Tel Siran inscription

E. Hebrew inscriptions (KAI 182-200)
 KAI 182: Gezer calendar
 KAI 183-188: Samaria Ostraca
 KAI 189: Siloam inscription
 KAI 190: Ophel ostracon
 KAI 191: Shebna inscription
 KAI 192-199: Lachish letters
 KAI 200: Yavne-Yam ostracon

F. Aramaic inscriptions

F.I: From Syria, Palestine and the Arabian Desert (KAI 201-230, 309-317)

Bureij
 KAI 201: Melqart stele

Tell Afis
 KAI 202: Stele of Zakkur

Sam'al
 KAI 214–215: Panamuwa inscriptions — in a distinctive language now known as Samalian.

As-Safira
 KAI 222-224: Sefire steles

Al-Nayrab
 KAI 225-226:  Sin zir Ibni inscription and Si Gabbor stele

Tell Fekheriye
 KAI 309: Tell Fekheriye bilingual inscription

Tel Dan
 KAI 310: Tel Dan Stele

Deir Alla
 KAI 312: Deir Alla Inscription — not generally accepted as Aramaic.

F.II: From Assyria (KAI 231-257)

F.III: From Asia Minor (KAI 258-265, 278, 318-319)

F.IV: From Egypt (KAI 266-272)
 KAI 269: Carpentras Stela

F.V: From the outlying areas (KAI 273-276, 279, 320)
 KAI 273: Aramaic Inscription of Taxila
 KAI 276: Stele of Serapit
 KAI 279: Kandahar Bilingual Rock Inscription

Appendices

Appendix I. Phoenician and Punic inscriptions in Greek script (KAI 174-177)

Appendix II. Latin-Libyan inscriptions (KAI 178-180)

References

Bibliography

 W. Röllig (1995), Phoenician and the Phoenicians in the context of the Ancient Near East, in S. Moscati (ed.), I Fenici ieri oggi domani : ricerche, scoperte, progetti, Roma, p. 203-214

See also
Corpus Inscriptionum Semiticarum
Keilschrift Texte aus Ugarit
Canaanite and Aramaic inscriptions

Book series introduced in 1960
1966 non-fiction books
Books about the ancient Near East
Canaanite languages
Aramaic languages
Inscriptions

Academic literature
Phoenician inscriptions
Aramaic inscriptions
Hebrew inscriptions
Moabite inscriptions
 
German books